Carlos Gainete Filho (born 15 November 1940), commonly known as Gainete, is a Brazilian retired football manager and former player. He played as a goalkeeper.

Started career in 1950 years in extinct Paula Ramos. In 1960 was transferred at Guarany (Bagé)and in 1962 at Sport Club Internacional. He was played in Vasco da Gama, Atlético (PR) and Atlético Carazinho.

Gainete played for Internacional and Atlético-PR in the Campeonato Brasileiro.

Honours

Player 
 Internacional
 Campeonato Gaúcho: 1969, 1970, 1971

Manager 
 Vitória
 Campeonato Baiano: 1985, 1990

 Goiás
 Campeonato Goiano: 1989

References

1940 births
Sportspeople from Florianópolis
Living people
Brazilian footballers
Association football goalkeepers
Brazilian football managers
Campeonato Brasileiro Série A players
Campeonato Brasileiro Série A managers
Guarany Futebol Clube players
Sport Club Internacional players
Club Athletico Paranaense players
Sport Club Internacional managers
Esporte Clube Juventude managers
Campinense Clube managers
Esporte Clube Internacional managers
Sport Club São Paulo managers
Ceará Sporting Club managers
Figueirense FC managers
Associação Atlética Internacional (Limeira) managers
Esporte Clube Vitória managers
Esporte Clube XV de Novembro (Piracicaba) managers
Esporte Clube Bahia managers
Guarani FC managers
Santos FC managers
Goiás Esporte Clube managers
Sport Club do Recife managers
São José Esporte Clube managers
Londrina Esporte Clube managers
Club Athletico Paranaense managers
Rio Branco Sport Club managers